Port Pirie is a city in South Australia.

Port Pirie may also refer to:

City of Port Pirie, a former local government area in South Australia
Electoral district of Port Pirie, a former state electoral district
Port Pirie Regional Council, a local government area in South Australia
Port Pirie Post Office, a post office in South Australia
Port Pirie Airport, airport in   South Australia
Roman Catholic Diocese of Port Pirie, a diocese in South Australia

See also

Port Pirie railway station (disambiguation)
Pirie (disambiguation)
Port Pirie South, South Australia
St Mark's Cathedral, Port Pirie
Sir John Pirie, 1st Baronet